Wiesenbach is a municipality in the Rhein-Neckar-Kreis in Baden-Württemberg.

Geography

The town sits on the L 532/ B 45, between the heights of the Odenwald and the hills of the Kraichgau about 127 to 327 meters above sea-level. It is 15 km east of Heidelberg.

It is called the gateway from the little Odenwald to the Kraichgau.

The German painter Wolfgang Maria Ohlhäuser lived there for 23 years.

References

Rhein-Neckar-Kreis
Baden